Tarkam (also Romanized as Tarkām, Terkām, and Ter Kām) is a village in Chahardangeh Rural District, Chahardangeh District, Sari County, Mazandaran Province, Iran. At the 2006 census, its population was 180, in 44 families.

References 

Populated places in Sari County